China Film Animation is the animation division of China Film Group.

History

In 2015, it was part of a deal to produce several feature films, together with Qi Tai Culture Development Group and Huhu Studios, contributing around 55% of the budget.

In October 2019, it was reported that China Film Animation and Huhu Studios had jointly produced the animated New Zealand film Mosley, making the film the first official New Zealand–China co-production.

Filmography

SXD: Middle Kingdom (2018)
Mosley (2019)

References

Chinese animation studios
China Film Group Corporation